Borassus flabellifer, commonly known as doub palm, palmyra palm, tala or tal palm, toddy palm, wine palm or ice apple, is native to South Asia (especially in Bangladesh and South India) and Southeast Asia. It is reportedly naturalized in Socotra and parts of China.

Description
The trunk is grey, robust and ringed with leaf scars; old leaves remain attached to the trunk for several years before falling cleanly. Like all Borassus species, B. flabellifer is dioecious with male and female flowers on separate plants. In contrast, the female flowers are golfball-sized and solitary, sitting upon the surface of the inflorescence axis. The fruits are black to brown with sweet, fibrous pulp and each seed is enclosed within a woody endocarp. Young palmyra seedlings grow slowly, producing only a few leaves each year (establishment phase), but at an as yet undetermined time, they grow rapidly, producing a substantial stem.

Uses

Fruit

The top portion of the fruit must be cut off to reveal the sweet jelly seed sockets, translucent pale-white, similar to that of the lychee but with a milder flavor and no pit. The sweet jelly seed sockets occur in combinations of two, three or four seeds inside the fruit. The jelly part of the fruit is covered with a thin, yellowish-brown skin. These are known to contain watery fluid inside the fleshy white body. These seed sockets have been the inspiration behind certain sandeshes called jalbhora (জলভরা) found in Bengal. The soft orange-yellow mesocarp pulp of the ripe fruit is sugary, dense and edible, rich in vitamins A and C. They also contain bitter compound called flabelliferrins, which are steroidal saponins.

The conventional way this fruit is eaten is when the outer casing is still unripe while the seeds are eaten as the fruit. But if the entire fruit is left to ripen, the fibrous outer layer of the palm fruits can also be eaten raw, boiled, or roasted. When this happens, the fruit takes a purple-blackish hue and tastes similar to coconut flesh. The skin is also eaten as part of the fruit similar to how mango skins are often consumed along with the fruit. Bengalis have perfected the art of making various sweet dishes with the yellowish viscous fluid substance obtained from a ripe palm fruit. These include mustard oil-fried (alternately sunflower oil-fried) taal-er bora (তালের বড়া) "palmyra vadas" or mixed with thickened milk to prepare taal-kheer (তাল ক্ষীর).

In northern India, the fruit is known as Taar Gola in Hindi-Urdu (ताड़ गोला / ). In Kerala it is called nonku (നൊങ്ക്) whereas in Tamil Nadu, it is called nungu (நுங்கு). In Odisha, it is called tala (ତାଳ). Ice apple in Indonesia is called buah lontar or siwalan. In Karnataka it is called "Taati Nungu"(ತಾಟಿ ನುಂಗು / ತಾಟಿ ನಿಂಗು). In Telangana and Andhra Pradesh, this fruit is called as "Thaati Munjalu" (తాటి ముంజలు). In Tulu language of Coastal Karnataka it is called “Erolu”(ಇರೋಲು).

Sap

Obtaining the sap traditionally involves tapping the top shoots and collecting the dripping juice in hanging earthen pots (in some regions a plastic or bamboo bottle). The juice collected in evening or after fermentation becomes sour, and is called Tadi (ताडी) in Marathi. This sap was the main source of sugar production in Thailand before sugarcane was introduced, as can be seen in the Thai word for sugar, which literally means the water of the tala palm.

A sugary sap called toddy can be obtained from the young inflorescence, either male or female. Toddy is fermented to make a beverage called arrack, or it is concentrated to a crude sugar called jaggery or Taal Patali (তাল পাটালী) in Bengali and Pana Vellam or Karuppukatti (கருப்புகட்டி or கருபட்டி) in Tamil. It is called Gula Jawa (Javanese sugar) in Indonesia, and is widely used in Javanese cuisine. In Thailand, it is called nam tan pik (น้ำตาลปึก), referring to the pack of sugar obtained from drying the palm sap, though in the modern day nam tan pik is often made from coconut water because the convenient of farming and harvesting.

In Thailand, there are techniques that utilize the anti-bacterial agents of some woods to keep the sap from becoming sour while tapping. After sterilization, the sap is available as a beverage called nam tan sod (น้ำตาลสด) or used to make an alcoholic beverage called nam tan mao (น้ำตาลเมา ).

Sprouts

In the Indian states of Tamil Nadu, Andhra Pradesh, Telangana and Bihar, and in Jaffna, Bengal, Sri Lanka, the seeds are planted and made to germinate and the fleshy stems (below the surface) are boiled or roasted and eaten. It is very fibrous and nutritious. It is known as Thegalu (తేగలు) or Gaygulu (గేగులు) or Gengulu (గెంగులు) (especially in Telangana) in Telugu, as Panai Kizhangu or Panangkizhangu (பனங்கிழங்கு) in Tamil, and as htabin myiq (ထန်းပင်မြစ်) in Myanmar.

The germinated seed's hard shell is also cut open to take out the crunchy kernel, which tastes like a sweeter water chestnut. It is called Buragunju (బురగుంజు) in Telugu and "thavanai" in Tamil.

The white kernel of the ripe palm fruit after being left for a few months is used as an offering in Lakshmi Puja in various parts of Bengal and is also eaten raw.

Leaves

The Borassus flabellifer leaves are used for thatching, mats, baskets, fans, hats, umbrellas, and as writing material.

All the literature of the old Tamil was written in preserved palm leaves also known as Palm-leaf manuscript. In Tamil Yaedu or Olai chuvadi. Most of the ancient literature in Telugu are written on palm leaves (Tala patra grandhas).

In Indonesia the leaves were used in the ancient culture as paper, known as "lontar" (from Old/Modern Javanese  ron tal "tal leaves") Leaves of suitable size, shape, texture, and maturity were chosen and then seasoned by boiling in salt water with turmeric powder, as a preservative. The leaves were then dried. When they were dry enough, the face of the leaf was polished with pumice, cut into the proper size, and a hole made in one corner. Each leaf made four pages. The writing was done with a stylus and had a very cursive and interconnected style.

The stem of the leaves has thorny edges (called "karukku" in Tamil).

The skin of the stem can be peeled off and be used as rope and also used to weave into cots (நார்க்கட்டில் in Tamil). In some part of Tamil Nadu, a variety of rice flour cake (called "Kozhukattai") is prepared using the leaf.

In the eastern part of India, the leaves are used to make hand fans.

Trunk
The stalks are used to make fences and also produce a strong, wiry fiber suitable for cordage and brushes. The black timber is hard, heavy, and durable and is highly valued for construction. It is superior to coconut timber, or red palm.

Crown
When the crown of the tree is removed, the segment from which the leaves grow out is an edible cake. This is called pananchoru (பனஞ்சோறு) in Tamil or thati adda (తాటి అడ్డ/తాటి మట్ట) in Telugu.

Roots
In Cambodia, where the palm is known as thnôt' (Khmer), the roots are dried and smoked to heal nasal complaints.

CultivationBorassus flabellifer has a growth pattern, very large size, and clean habits that make it an attractive ornamental tree, cultivated for planting in gardens and parks as landscape palm species.

Cultural symbolism

The palmyra tree is the official tree of Tamil Nadu. Highly respected in Tamil culture, it is called "katpaha tharu" ("celestial tree") because all its parts have a use. Panaiveriyamman, named after panai, the Tamil name for the Palmyra palm, is an ancient tree deity related to fertility linked to this palm. This deity is also known as Taalavaasini, a name that further relates her to all types of palms.
The Asian palmyra palm is a symbol of Cambodia where it is a very common palm, found all over the country. It also grows near the Angkor Wat temple.
In Indonesia the Palmyra tree is the symbol of South Sulawesi province.
This plant has captured the imagination of Bengalis, especially in the words of Rabindranth Tagore whose nursery rhyme 'Taal Gaach ek Paye daariye' (তাল গাছ এক পায়ে দাড়িয়ে.., literally Palmyra tree standing on a single leg ... ) in Sahaj Path (সহজ পাঠ) is a staple reading material in most schools in West Bengal & Bangladesh.
 In the Hindu epic Mahabharata'', a palmyra tree is the chariot-banner of Bheeshma and Balarama.

See also

 Shitala

References

External links
 Tropical fruits: Asian Palmyra Palm 
 The Hindu: Delicious Summer Fruit
 The Hindu: Slurp! It's Nungu season
 Nungu for sale
 Tamil Nadu Palm Products Development Board

flabellifer
Tropical fruit
Fruits originating in Asia
Flora of tropical Asia
Cambodian cuisine
Indian cuisine
Indonesian cuisine
Garden plants of Asia
Ornamental trees
Plants described in 1753
Taxa named by Carl Linnaeus